Alan G. Hassenfeld (born ) is an American former chairman and chief executive officer of Hasbro Toys.

Career
He is the brother of Stephen D. Hassenfeld, who preceded him in the post. Hasbro was founded as a Hassenfeld family business in 1923. As chairman and chief executive, he has diversified Hasbro's portfolio of companies and expanded international operations while initiating a singular brand of corporate activism designed to improve the lives of children. He was inducted into the Toy Industry Hall of Fame in 1996.

Philanthropy

 Hassenfeld donated the Teddy Fountain to the city of Jerusalem.

 In 2008, Hassenfeld established the nonprofit Hassenfeld Family Initiative LLC, an organization focused on women and children's rights and safety

 Bryant University renamed their Public Leadership institute after Hassenfeld in 2012.

 In 2014, Hassenfeld made a major gift to establish the Hassenfeld Family Innovation Center at Brandeis University, and has funded the Hassenfeld Foundation Scholarship, and other scholarships and endowments there.

 A $12.5 million gift from the family of Alan Hassenfeld established the Hassenfeld Child Health Innovation Institute at Brown University in 2015. In 2020, Hassenfeld joined the Brown University Board of Trustees.

Notes

Living people
1948 births
Businesspeople from Providence, Rhode Island
American chief executives of manufacturing companies
20th-century American Jews
20th-century American businesspeople
21st-century American Jews